Florey may refer to several people:

 Howard Florey, Nobel Prize-winning Australian pharmacologist
 Electoral district of Florey, is a state electoral district in South Australia named after Florey
 Kitty Burns Florey, American author and editor
 Robert Florey, French screenwriter and film director

Places 
Florey may also refer to several places:

 Florey, Australian Capital Territory, suburb of Canberra, Australia named after Howard Florey
 Combe Florey, village in Somerset, England
 Florey (crater), a lunar impact crater on the lunar near side near the northern pole
 Florey, Texas, an unincorporated community in Andrews County, Texas

other 
Florey may also refer to several other topics:

 Howard Florey Institute, medical research institute named after Howard Florey

English-language surnames
German-language surnames